The Society Party (Norwegian: Samfundspartiet) was a political party in Norway founded in 1932. The party was founded by author Bertram Dybwad Brochmann, who gained representation in the Norwegian Parliament from Bergen from 1933 to 1936. In a highly symbolic gesture, Brochmann refused to accept his salary as a member of parliament. On the background of the Great Depression, the party sought a total revision of the economic theories of the time. The party was later represented in parliament from Nordland from 1937 to 1940 (1945). The party contested its last election in the 1949 parliamentary election, and was dissolved later the same year.

References 

Political parties established in 1932
1932 establishments in Norway
Political parties disestablished in 1949
1949 disestablishments in Norway
Defunct political parties in Norway